Karl (Kalle) Rautio (20 November 1889, in Vaasa Province15 December 1963, in Petrozavodsk) was the composer of the Anthem of the Karelo-Finnish Soviet Socialist Republic and one of the founders of professional musical art in Karelia.

Biography
An ethnic Karelian, Karl Rautio was born into a peasant family in the Vaasa region of the Grand Duchy of Finland in 1889. The Rautios immigrated to the United States in 1903, where he made out a living as a miner, along with studying music. Rautio enrolled as a music student at the University of California, Berkeley in 1916, graduating in 1920. In 1922 he immigrated to the Soviet Union, settling in Karelia.

From 1931 to 1935 he organized and conducted the Radio Symphony Orchestra of the Karelian Autonomous Soviet Socialist Republic, whose first performance over the Soviet airwaves took place under his direction in 1931. Together with the Finnish poet Armas Äikiä, who wrote the lyrics, Rautio submitted the winning entry for music and lyrics for the Anthem of the Karelo-Finnish Soviet Socialist Republic in 1945.

Petrozavodsk's K.E. Rautio Musical College, formerly known as the Petrozavodsk School of Music, bears Karl Rautio's name since December 29, 1971. A sign marking the location of his house in Petrozavodsk was installed in 1987.

References

External links
 The first page of Rautio's First Symphony

1889 births
1963 deaths
20th-century classical composers
Bolsheviks
Communist Party of the Soviet Union members
Finnish classical composers
Finnish emigrants to the United States (1809–1917)
American emigrants to the Soviet Union
History of Karelia
Soviet composers
Soviet male composers
University of California, Berkeley alumni
Finnish male classical composers
Karelian people
20th-century male musicians
20th-century Finnish composers